Stephen Logan Browne (21 June 1964 – 1 January 2017) was an English professional footballer who played as a midfielder in the English Football League for Charlton Athletic and in non-League football for Maidstone United, Wealdstone, Yeovil Town and Slough Town.

Career
Browne joined Charlton Athletic as a youth player straight from school and made his first team debut as a 17-year-old against Wrexham in February 1982. He had a four-game spell at Isthmian League side Hendon at the start of 1996. He had a spell with Yeovil Town and was an integral part of the squad that gained promotion back to the Conference from the Isthmian League in the 1996–97 campaign under the tenure of Graham Roberts. He made a total of 88 appearances for the Glovers. In the early part of the 1998–99 season he signed for Slough Town and was player/assistant manager, where he linked up again with Graham Roberts. He made 45 appearances as a player before succeeding Roberts as manager after his departure in 1999. In October 2004 he was appointed manager of Isthmian League side Dover Athletic on a contract until the end of the 2005–06 season. He was sacked as manager of Dover in January 2005, following a takeover by Jim Parmenter as chairman and he was replaced by former boss Clive Walker. In June 2005 he took Dover to an industrial tribunal over his sacking, however, the dispute was settled a month later. He was appointed manager of Isthmian League Division One North side Potters Bar Town in May 2007 and remained there until December 2008 when he joined Enfield Town.

Personal life
Browne died on in January 2017, at the age of 52, following a battle with bowel cancer. His son Rhys Browne is an Antigua and Barbuda international and also played in the English Football League.

References

1964 births
People from the London Borough of Hackney
2017 deaths
English footballers
Association football midfielders
Charlton Athletic F.C. players
Maidstone United F.C. (1897) players
Wealdstone F.C. players
Slough Town F.C. players
Hendon F.C. players
Yeovil Town F.C. players
Sutton United F.C. players
English Football League players
Isthmian League players
National League (English football) players